Francine Irving Neff (December 6, 1925 – February 9, 2010) was the 35th Treasurer of the United States, serving from June 21, 1974, to January 19, 1977. She was appointed by Richard Nixon but continued serving as Treasurer through Gerald Ford's term in office after Nixon resigned in August 1974.

Treasurer
Neff took office at a time when the role of Treasurer was being reorganized. The Treasurer was named National Director of the Savings Bonds Division for the first time during her term. She was the first Treasurer to manage a bureau and the first to report to the Undersecretary for Monetary Affairs. Neff also oversaw the Treasury-wide bicentennial program.

Personal life
Neff grew up on a small vegetable farm outside of Mountainair, NM. Neff was a member of the Horatio Alger Association of Distinguished Americans, held an honorary doctorate from New Mexico State University, and was a member of Alpha Delta Pi.

Death
Francine Irving Neff died from heart failure on February 9, 2010, in Pena Blanca, New Mexico.

References

1925 births
2010 deaths
Politicians from Albuquerque, New Mexico
Treasurers of the United States
New Mexico Republicans
Women in New Mexico politics
21st-century American women